Eva la Trailera is an American telenovela created by Valentina Párraga and produced by Martha Godoy for Telemundo.

The series stars Edith González as Eva, Arap Bethke as Pablo, Jorge Luis Pila as Armando and Erika de la Rosa as Marlene.

The telenovela is an original story written by Valentina Párraga and is not an adaptation of Lola the Truck Driver produced in 1983.

Plot 
Eva La Trailera tells the story of a strong, determined and impetuous woman who is more than ready to take on any challenge. But her life is disrupted by a series of cruel betrayals which require her to make decisions that lead to increasingly difficult roads. Her trials include her husband Armando's infidelity and his suggestion that is her fault, her realization about her best friend Marlene's true sinister and envious nature, and her relationship resentful sister and niece, that later becomes Armando's mistress.

Production 
The cast of the telenovela was confirmed on December 2, 2015. The telenovela is filmed in locations such as; Miami, United States.

Cast

Main 
 Edith González as Eva Soler
 Arap Bethke as Pablo Contreras
 Jorge Luis Pila as Armando Montes
 Erika de la Rosa as Marlene Palacios
 Javier Díaz Dueñas as Martín Contreras
 Vanessa Bauche as Soraya Luna 
 Sofía Lama as Elizabeth "Betty" Cárdenas
 Henry Zakka as Robert Monteverde
 Roberto Mateos as Pancho Mogollón
 Antonio Gaona as Andrés Palacios
 Katie Barberi as Cynthia Monteverde
 Karen Sentíes as Carmen Soler
 Minnie West as Adriana Montes 
 Adrián Carvajal as  Jota Jota "J.J." Juárez
 Jonathan Freudman as Robert "Bobby" Monteverde Jr. / Luis Mogollón
 Michelle Vargas as Sofía Soler
 Jorge Eduardo García as Diego Contreras
 Nicole Apollonio as Fabiola Montes 
 Martha Mijares as Bertha Soler
 Dayana Garroz as Marisol
 Alfredo Huereca as Evencio Melgar

Recurring 
 Gaby Borges as Teresa Aguilar
 Mónica Sánchez Navarro as Federica Miraval
 Paloma Márquez as Virginia Blanco
 Ana Osorio as Camila Rosas
 Maritza Bustamante as Ana María Granados
 María Raquenel as Rebeca Marín
 Tony Vela as Antonio "El Chivo" García
 Adriana Bermúdez as Noemi Ávila
 Gustavo Pedraza as Esteban Corrales
 Christian Cataldi as Jorge
 Eduardo Shilinsky as Ernesto Soler
 Omar Germenos as Reynaldo Santacruz
 Alpha Acosta as Anastasia Soler

Awards and nominations

References

External links 
 
Eva's Destiny on Telemundo Internacional

Telemundo telenovelas
2016 telenovelas
American telenovelas
Spanish-language American telenovelas
2016 American television series debuts
2016 American television series endings